| tries = {{#expr:
 +10 + 6 + 4 + 1 + 4 + 7
 + 6 + 5 + 7 + 6 + 2 + 6
 + 1 + 2 + 5 + 5 + 0 + 6
 + 3 + 3 + 9 + 3 + 1 + 1
 + 2 + 5 + 4 + 4 + 1 + 4
 + 2 + 2 + 8 + 6 + 3 + 1
 + 4 + 5 + 1 + 5 + 4 + 6
 + 2 + 1 + 3 + 4 + 3 + 1
 + 0 + 0 + 2 + 3 + 1 + 4
+ 3 + 5 + 3 + 0 + 5 + 3
+ 1 + 1 + 1 + 4 + 0 + 3
+ 5 + 2 + 2 + 4 + 1 + 2
+ 4 + 4 + 2 + 4 + 6 + 2
+ 3 + 3 + 5 + 3 + 3 + 3
+ 5 + 5 + 2 + 3 + 7 + 3
+ 4 + 6 + 6 + 4 + 7 + 3
+ 6 + 7 + 7 + 7 + 3 + 5
+ 2 + 1 + 3 + 6 + 0 + 2
+ 4 + 6 + 3 + 5 + 5 + 7
+ 5 + 2 + 2 + 6 + 8 + 6
+ 6 + 5 +10 + 8 + 8 + 7
+ 8 + 6 + 8 + 7 + 4 + 5
+ 5 + 4 + 7
}}
| top point scorer = Nick Evans (Harlequins)(258 points)
| top try scorer = Tom Varndell (Wasps),Christian Wade (Wasps)(13 tries)
| website    = www.premiershiprugby.com
| prevseason = 2011–12
| nextseason = 2013–14
}}

The 2012–13 Aviva Premiership was the 26th season of the top flight English domestic rugby union competition and the third one to be sponsored by Aviva. The reigning champions entering the season were Harlequins, who had claimed their first title after defeating Leicester Tigers in the 2012 final. London Welsh had been promoted as champions from the 2011–12 RFU Championship, their first promotion to the top flight.

Summary
Leicester Tigers won their tenth title after defeating Northampton Saints in the final at Twickenham after having finished second in the regular season table. London Welsh were relegated in part for having received a 5 point deduction for fielding a player who did not hold an Effective Registration. It was the first time that London Welsh have been relegated from the top flight since they first achieved promotion.

As usual, round 1 included the London Double Header at Twickenham, the ninth instance since its inception in 2004.

Rule changes
For the second consecutive season, significant changes were made to the Premiership's salary cap. Last season, "academy credits" were introduced, giving each team a £30,000 cap credit for each of up to eight home-grown players in the senior squad. This season, the team cap rose for the first time since the 2008–09 season, when it was increased from £2.2 million to £4 million. The new cap is £4.26 million before academy credits and up to £4.5 million with credits. In addition, each team was allowed to sign one player whose salary did not count against the cap.

Teams
Twelve teams compete in the league – the top eleven teams from the previous season and London Welsh who were promoted from the 2011–12 RFU Championship to the top flight for the first time. They replaced Newcastle Falcons who were relegated after fifteen years in the top flight.

Stadiums and locations

Pre-season
Following a lengthy appeal, London Welsh successfully gained promotion to the Premiership, having contested the Professional Game Boards recommendation to refuse them entry based on the Minimum Standards Criteria. This meant that Newcastle Falcons were relegated, following their confirmation that they would not appeal the new decision.

The 2012 edition of the Premiership Rugby Sevens Series began on 13 July 2012 at The Stoop, continued on 20 July at Edgeley Park and 26 July at Kingsholm.  This was the first opportunity of the season for any of the teams competing in the Premiership to win a trophy.  The finals were held on 3 August 2012 at The Recreation Ground and the Series was won by London Irish.

Table

Regular season
Premiership Rugby announced the fixture list on 4 July 2012. As with previous seasons, Round 1 included the London Double Header at Twickenham.

Fixtures as per Premiership Rugby Match Centre.

Round 1

Round 2

Round 3

Round 4

Round 5

Round 6

Round 7

Round 8

Round 9

Round 10

Round 11

Round 12

Round 13

Round 14

Round 15

Round 16

Round 17

Round 18

Round 19

Round 20

Round 21

Round 22
All games in Round 22 kicked off at 15.00 on 4 May 2013, so as to not give any team a potential advantage with regards to knowing how to achieve a play-off berth, Heineken Cup place, or safety from relegation.

Play-offs
As in previous seasons, the top four teams in the Premiership table, following the conclusion of the regular season, contest the play-off semi-finals in a 1st vs 4th and 2nd vs 3rd format, with the higher ranking team having home advantage. The two winners of the semi-finals then meet in the Premiership Final at Twickenham on 25 May 2013.

Bracket

Semi-finals

Final
The final was contested at Twickenham on 25 May 2013 between Leicester Tigers and Northampton Saints with Leicester winning 37-17. Northampton captain Dylan Hartley was sent off for using foul and abusive language just before half-time after calling referee Wayne Barnes a "f*****g cheat" . This was the first time a player has ever been red carded in a Premiership Final, as was said by the commentators during the match.

Leading scorers
Note: Flags indicate national union as has been defined under WR eligibility rules. Players may hold more than one non-WR nationality.

Most points
Source:

Most tries
Source:

Season attendances

By club

Notes

References

External links
Official Site
2012–13 English Premiership Full Results

 
2012-13
 
England